The history of the USSR championships began on April 4, 1933. On that day the first matches among the national teams of the five cities were held at the Palace of Metalworkers in Dnepropetrovsk. These competitions, as well as the next three similar championships, were officially called the All-Union Volleyball Holidays.

The USSR championships among club teams representing various voluntary sports societies and departments were held since 1938. In 1956, 1959, 1963 and 1967 the USSR champion title was played in the Summer Spartakiad of the Peoples of the USSR. In 1937, 1941-1944 and 1964 there were no USSR Championship competitions.

In the 1991/92 season the USSR Volleyball Federation organized the CIS Open Championship, a number of its participants in 1992 played in parallel the first Russian Championship.

List of Champions 

Sources

See also
Volleyball in Russia 
Russian Volleyball Super League

References

External links 
 Soviet Union Men's Championship Editions 

 

Soviet Union
1933 establishments in the Soviet Union
Volleyball in the Soviet Union